Anasterias is a genus of starfish in the family Asteriidae.

Species
The World Register of Marine Species lists the following species:

 Anasterias antarctica (Lütken, 1857)
 Anasterias antipodium (Bell, 1882)
 Anasterias asterinoides Perrier, 1875
 Anasterias directa (Koehler, 1920)
 Anasterias laevigata (Hutton, 1879)
 Anasterias mawsoni (Koehler, 1920)
 Anasterias pedicellaris Koehler, 1923
 Anasterias perrieri (E. A. Smith, 1876)
 Anasterias rupicola (Verrill, 1876)
 Anasterias sphoerulata (Koehler, 1920)
 Anasterias spirabilis (Bell, 1881)
 Anasterias studeri Perrier, 1891
 Anasterias suteri (deLoriol, 1894)
 Anasterias varia (Philippi, 1870)

References

Asteriidae
Taxa named by Edmond Perrier